Fred C. Patton (born March 3, 1974) is an American politician who represents the 50th District in the Kansas House of Representatives.  He was first elected to the House of Representatives in November 2014. Patton currently serves as the chairman of the House Judiciary Committee  and of the House Rules and Journal Committee. Patton also serves on the House Capitol Preservation Committee, the Corrections & Juvenile Justice Committee, and the House Redistricting Committee.  He previously served as chairman of the Joint Special Committee on Kansas Emergency Management Act and the House K-12 Budget Committee and as vice-chairman of the House Judiciary Committee and the Joint Special Committee on Judiciary.

Patton also serves on the Seaman U.S.D. 345 Board of Education.  He was first elected to the school board in 2003.  He has served five terms as president of the board.  Patton served as president of the Kansas Association of School Boards from 2010 to 2012.

Patton has been married to Kim Patton, a library media specialist at North Fairview Elementary School, since 1997. They live in Topeka, Kansas with their three children, Zachary (age 23), Andrew (age 20), and Emily (age 16).

References

External links
 Kansas Legislature Website

1974 births
Living people
People from Topeka, Kansas
21st-century American politicians
Republican Party members of the Kansas House of Representatives
Washburn University alumni
University of Kansas alumni